Pietroșani is a commune in Argeș County, Muntenia, Romania. It is composed of five villages: Bădești, Gănești, Pietroșani, Retevoiești and Vărzăroaia.

References

Communes in Argeș County
Localities in Muntenia